is a district located in Nara Prefecture, Japan.

In 2020, the district had an estimated population of 37,086 and a density of 18.05 persons per km2. The total area is 2,055 km2.

On September 25, 2005, the villages of Ōtō and Nishiyoshino merged into the city of Gojō.

Towns and villages 
Ōyodo
Shimoichi
Yoshino
Higashiyoshino
Kamikitayama
Kawakami
Kurotaki
Nosegawa
Shimokitayama
Tenkawa
Totsukawa

References

Districts in Nara Prefecture